The Ali Matan Mosque is a mosque in Hargeisa, Somaliland.

Architecture
The mosque is a 4-story building.

See also
 Islam in Somalia

References

External links
 

Mosques in Somaliland
Buildings and structures in Hargeisa